Marcos Alberto Covarrubias Villaseñor (born July 2, 1967) is a Mexican politician. He has served as the Governor of the Mexican state of Baja California Sur since April 5, 2012.

Marcos Covarrubias Villaseñor was a deputy in the Chamber of Deputies of Mexico prior to being elected Governor in 2011. He had been elected to the Chamber through the support of the Party of the Democratic Revolution (PRD).

Covarrubias Villaseñor ran for Governor of Baja California Sur in the 2011 gubernatorial election, which was held on February 6, 2011. He was nominated by the National Action Party (PAN). The Party of the Democratic Revolution (PRD) had held the state's governorship since 1999 at the time. Marcos Covarrubias Villaseñor won the gubernatorial election with more than 40% of the vote. The Institutional Revolutionary Party (PRI) candidate, Ricardo Barroso Agramont, came in second with 33.52%, while the incumbent PRD's candidate, Luis Armando Díaz, came in at a distant third with approximately 20% of the vote.

Covarrubias Villaseñor was sworn into office on April 5, 2011.

References

1967 births
Governors of Baja California Sur
Members of the Chamber of Deputies (Mexico)
National Action Party (Mexico) politicians
Politicians from Guadalajara, Jalisco
Living people
21st-century Mexican politicians
Universidad del Valle de Atemajac alumni
Municipal presidents in Baja California Sur
Deputies of the LXI Legislature of Mexico